The 2018–19 Purdue Fort Wayne Mastodons men's basketball team represented Purdue University Fort Wayne during the 2018–19 NCAA Division I men's basketball season. The Mastodons were led by fifth-year head coach Jon Coffman and split their home games between the Gates Sports Center and the Allen County War Memorial Coliseum as members of the Summit League.

The season was the first in which Mastodons represented the new Purdue University Fort Wayne (PFW). The team previously represented the now defunct Indiana University – Purdue University Fort Wayne. On July 1, 2018, IPFW split into two separate institutions, with IU taking responsibility for IPFW's degree programs in health sciences and Purdue retaining all other academic programs. The Mastodons have since represented PFW. With the name change, the school's colors changed from Royal Blue and White to the Old Gold and Black used by the other three Purdue University campuses. On June 18, 2018, the school announced that beginning July 1, 2018 all NCAA sports teams would be known as the Purdue Fort Wayne Mastodons. In addition, a new logo was revealed where the color blue has been incorporated as a secondary color to the university's official school colors of gold and black.

Previous season 
The Mastodons finished the 2017–18 season 18–15, 7–7 in Summit League play to finish in fourth place. They lost in the quarterfinals of the Summit League tournament to North Dakota State. They were invited to the CollegeInsdier.com Tournament where they lost in the first round to Central Michigan.

The season was the last in which the Mastodons represented IPFW, using "Fort Wayne" as its athletic brand.

Roster

Schedule and results

|-
!colspan=9 style=| Exhibition

|-
!colspan=9 style=| Non-conference regular season

|-
!colspan=9 style=| Summit League regular season

|-
!colspan=9 style=|Summit League tournament

References

Purdue Fort Wayne Mastodons men's basketball seasons
Purdue Fort Wayne
Purdue Fort Wayne
Purdue Fort Wayne